Halbert v. Michigan, 545 U.S. 605 (2005), was a case in which the Supreme Court of the United States held that a Michigan law (Mich. Comp. Laws Ann. § 770.3a (West 2000)), which denied public counsel for defendants appealing a conviction on a plea, violated the equal protection and due process clauses of the Fourteenth Amendment to the United States Constitution. In a majority opinion written by Justice Ruth Bader Ginsburg, the Court affirmed that "a State is required to appoint counsel for an indigent defendant’s first-tier appeal as of right."

See also
List of United States Supreme Court cases, volume 545
List of United States Supreme Court cases

References

External links
 

United States Supreme Court cases
United States Supreme Court cases of the Rehnquist Court
Legal history of Michigan
2005 in United States case law